Michele Rayner-Goolsby (born September 25, 1981) is an American attorney and politician. She has served as a member of the Florida House of Representatives since 2020, representing District 70 in Pinellas, Hillsborough, Manatee, and Sarasota Counties. She is the first openly lesbian black woman elected to the Florida Legislature.

Early life and career 
Rayner was born and raised in Clearwater, Florida. She attended Florida State University, receiving her B.S. in international affairs and political science in 2003, and M.S. in international affairs in 2006. After graduating from Florida Coastal School of Law in 2011 and being admitted to the Florida Bar, she returned to Clearwater and worked as an assistant public defender in the state's Sixth Judicial Circuit, and then as a lawyer in private practice.

Rayner is the lead counsel of Civil Liberty Law. She was also the local counsel of the NAACP Legal Defense and Educational Fund. She is a member of the Fred G. Minnis Sr. Bar Association and Delta Sigma Theta.

Florida Legislature 
In 2020, Rayner ran for the Florida House of Representatives seat vacated by Wengay Newton, who opted to run for the Pinellas County Commission. Rayner raised $116,900 in campaign funds, over double that of her nearest competitor. Rayner garnered 31.3% of the vote against three other candidates in the Democratic primary, with second-place finisher Keisha Bell receiving 26.8%. Rayner was elected without opposition in the general election.

Rayner is the first black lesbian woman elected to Florida's legislature. She was endorsed by Equality Florida, the Florida Education Association, Democratic Progressive Caucus of Florida, U.S. Representative Charlie Crist, and Florida state representative Jennifer Webb. She was not endorsed by the Stonewall Democrats of Pinellas County.

In April 2022, Rayner argued that the effort to repeal the Reedy Creek Improvement Act was emblematic of the "deep selfishness and the deep blind political ambition" of Ron DeSantis, and adding that it is "unconscionable" that he is doing this effort on the "backs of working people."

On April 21, 2022, Rayner attempted to stage a sit-in demonstration to prevent a vote on Florida's congressional district maps. Opponents of the tactic compared her actions to an insurrection. The demonstration was ultimately unsuccessful.

Elections

Personal life 
Rayner is a black lesbian woman. She is married to Bianca Goolsby.

References

External links
 

1981 births
20th-century African-American people
20th-century African-American women
African-American activists
21st-century African-American women
21st-century African-American politicians
21st-century American lawyers
21st-century American politicians
21st-century American women lawyers
21st-century American women politicians
Activists from Florida
African-American lawyers
African-American state legislators in Florida
African-American women lawyers
American civil rights lawyers
American social justice activists
LGBT African Americans
LGBT lawyers
LGBT state legislators in Florida
Living people
Democratic Party members of the Florida House of Representatives
Place of birth missing (living people)
Lesbian politicians
Women civil rights activists
Women state legislators in Florida
Public defenders